Sharjeel Imam (born 1988) is an Indian student activist from Kako village of Jehanabad, Bihar, known for alleged hate speech against India in the Citizenship Amendment Act Protests. He had completed his B.Tech. and M.Tech. from IIT-Bombay and joined Jawaharlal Nehru University in 2013 for completing his master's degree in Modern History and in 2015 he started Ph.D. from the same university. He was charged with sedition by five states of India. He was arrested by Delhi Police on 28 January 2020, who alleged that his speech promoted enmity among people that led to riots in Jamia Millia Islamia.

Early life and education
Sharjeel Imam was born in 1988 at Kako village of Jehanabad district, Bihar. His father Akbar Imam was a politician; his mother Afshan Rahim is a homemaker, and his brother Muzzammil Imam is a social activist. Akbar Imam was a Janata Dal (United) 's candidate in the Jehanabad constituency in the 2005 assembly election. In 2014, Akbar died of cancer after an illness lasting many years.

Sharjeel Imam started school in 1994; he was considered a bibliophile by his teachers. He did his schooling from a missionary school in Patna, and later, Delhi Public School, Vasant Kunj. After completing high school in 2006, he studied computer engineering at the Indian Institute of Technology Bombay. After graduation, he spent two years in Bengaluru, where he joined a software company. In 2013, he joined Jawaharlal Nehru University to complete his master's degree in Modern History and started PhD in 2015 from the same university.

Career
Imam worked at the IT University of Copenhagen as a programmer for two months in 2009 and later worked as a teaching assistant at IIT Bombay. Thereafter, he worked as an engineer at Juniper Networks before returning to academics. Imam wrote articles for TRT World, Firstpost, The Quint, and The Wire.

Political activism
Imam initially appeared as an active volunteer of Anti-CAA Protest at Shaheen Bagh, Delhi. The police said that Imam made two "very inflammatory and instigatory speeches in his opposition to CAA and NRC" on 13 December 2019 and 16 January 2020. The latter speech was 40 minutes long; in a three-minute long viral video of that speech, Imam could be heard calling for Assam to be permanently "cut off" from the rest of India by blocking the Siliguri corridor also known as "Chicken's Neck", which he later claimed was call for a simple "chakka jam" — a form of protest that involves roadblock and stopping vehicular movements.

Citing the Brandenburg versus Ohio ruling, former Supreme Court Justice Markandey Katju came out in defence of Sharjeel, arguing for quashing of FIRs against him, saying that "he has not committed a crime", even though he disapproves of his speech. Sharjeel's arrest was widely condemned by politicians, teachers, students, activists and other organizations. The Jawaharlal Nehru University Students' Union said that his arrest is a matter of "Islamophobia, selective amnesia & bias" of the state apparatus. JNU Teachers' Association alleged that the sedition charge was invoked due to "other reasons" and that it reflects "politicisation" of the conduct of law enforcement agencies. One hundred and forty-eight students and alumni of various IITs (Indian Institutes of Technology) and over a hundred students from Jamia Millia Islamia, AMU and other state universities signed a letter in his support. A group of students hailing from Bihar and studying in prominent institutions, including Jawaharlal Nehru University and IIT Delhi, wrote an open letter to RJD leader Tejashwi Yadav urging him to demand the release of Imam, highlighting Imam's contribution as an academician, student, historian and journalist.

Over 50 activists were booked under sedition charges by Mumbai Police for raising slogans in support of Sharjeel Imam at a Pride Solidarity gathering in February 2020.

Cases filed by different states
Five Indian states have filed various cases against Imam includes Assam, Uttar Pradesh, Manipur, Arunachal Pradesh and Delhi.
On 25 January 2020, Assam Police registered a First Information Report (FIR) against Imam for his speech under section 13 (1)/18 of UA(P)ACT read with section 153A, 153B and 124A of Indian Penal Code (IPC).
On the same day, Aligarh Police in Uttar Pradesh also registered case against Imam for sedition and creating enmity between two groups.
Manipur police also filed an FIR against Imam for waging war against the Indian government, sedition, indulging in vilification, attacks on a particular group or conspiracy to commit offences. The police filed the FIR for his remarks of "cut off" northeast from rest of the country under FIR number 16(1)2020 IPC under sections 121/121-A/124-A/120-B/153 IPC.
On 26 January 2020, Arunachal Pradesh's Itanagar police filed a FIR against Imam under section 124(A), 153(A) and 153(B) of the Indian Penal Code for sedition, promoting enmity between groups.
The Delhi police filed an FIR under Indian Penal Code's section 153 in addition to the charges of sedition and promoting religious enmity.

Prison 
On 28 January 2020, Sharjeel Imam was arrested by Delhi police for allegedly delivering inflammatory speeches against Citizenship (Amendment) Act (CAA) and National Register of Citizens (NRC). He was also booked under Unlawful Activities (Prevention) Act. After his arrest, he was taken to Assam and is held in Guwahati Central Jail. Whilst in prison, he was infected with COVID-19 and tested positive for it on 21 July 2020.

On 29 July 2020, Delhi Court had issued a summon against Imam in the case related to his alleged inflammatory speech. Additional Sessions Judge Dharmender Rana, after viewing the charge-sheet filed against Imam under UAPA, asked him to appear in court on 1 September 2020. The court took this decision due to the coronavirus pandemic and said that if the physical appearance of the Imam is not possible then he can be presented via video-conferencing.

In April 2022, a District Court in Delhi denied bail to Imam in a case alleging a "larger conspiracy" into the 2020 Delhi riots, involving charges under UAPA and Indian Penal Code, stating that the allegations were "prima facie true".

Notes

References

Further reading 
 

Indian activists
1988 births
Living people
People involved in the Citizenship Amendment Act protests
People charged with treason
Indian Muslims
IIT Bombay alumni
Jawaharlal Nehru University alumni
People from Jehanabad district
Indian columnists
Delhi Public School alumni